Alkemade is a former municipality in the western Netherlands, in the province of South Holland. Before its merger with Jacobswoude, the municipality covered an area of 30.91 km² (11.93 mile² ) of which 3.94 km² (1.52 mile²) is water. It had a population of 14,481 in 2004.

The municipality of Alkemade comprised the communities of Kaag, Nieuwe Wetering, Oud Ade, Oude Wetering, Rijpwetering, and Roelofarendsveen. There is no settlement called Alkemade itself.

The municipality has many greenhouses and 13 windmills, one of which dates from 1632. Water sports are popular here because of its location on the lakes Kagerplassen and Braassemermeer.

On January 1, 2009, Alkemade and Jacobswoude merged and formed the new municipality of Kaag en Braassem.

Notable people
Joop Doderer (1921-2005) - actor
Joop Zoetemelk (1946) - cyclist, winner of the Tour de France 1980
Lou Geels (1908-1979) - actor
Bart Spring in 't Veld (1976) - Big Brother 2000 winner
Alex Turk (1975) - cartoonist
Sanne van der Star (1986) - speed skater
Monique Velzeboer (1971) - speed skater, gold medal at the 1988 Olympics
Simone Velzeboer - speed skater
Lars Hoogenboom - marathon skater
Femke Heemskerk - swimmer
Ilana Rooderkerk (1987) - soap opera actress 
Marike Koek (1953) - actress
Bobbie Koek (1985) - actress
Dioomen - D.J.

See also
Vrije en Lage Boekhorst

Municipalities of the Netherlands disestablished in 2009
Former municipalities of South Holland
Kaag en Braassem